Costello & Nieve is a limited edition five-disc 1996 live album by Elvis Costello and Steve Nieve recorded in Los Angeles, San Francisco, Chicago, Boston and New York City, which was released in the US only.

Track listing 
All songs written by Elvis Costello unless otherwise indicated.

Disc 1 (Recorded on May 14, 1996 Live at The Troubadour, Los Angeles)
 "Temptation" – 3:50
 "Poor Fractured Atlas" – 4:58
 "I Just Don't Know What to Do with Myself" (Burt Bacharach, Hal David) – 3:27
 "It's Time" – 5:55
 "Man Out of Time" – 4:53
 "Shallow Grave" (Costello, Paul McCartney) – 2:54

Disc 2 (Recorded on May 15, 1996 Live at The Fillmore, San Francisco)
 "Just About Glad" – 3:59
 "Why Can't a Man Stand Alone?" – 4:10
 "My Dark Life" – 7:13
 "All This Useless Beauty" – 5:57
 "Ship of Fools" (Jerry Garcia, Robert Hunter) – 6:12

Disc 3 (Recorded on May 18, 1996 Live at The Park West, Chicago)
 "The Long Honeymoon" – 4:25
 "Starting to Come to Me" – 2:47
 "The Other End of the Telescope" (Costello, Aimee Mann) – 4:32
 "All the Rage" – 4:02
 "Watching the Detectives" – 6:09

Disc 4 (Recorded on May 20, 1996 Live at The Paradise, Boston)
 "You Bowed Down" – 4:56
 "The Long Honeymoon" – 4:46
 "Distorted Angel" – 4:45
 "(The Angels Wanna Wear My) Red Shoes" – 2:49
 "Little Atoms" – 5:37
 "My Funny Valentine" (Richard Rodgers, Lorenz Hart) – 3:02

Disc 5 (Recorded on May 22, 1996 Live at The Supper Club, New York)
 "Black Sails in the Sunset" – 3:17
 "You'll Never Be a Man" – 3:16
 "Just a Memory" – 3:44
 "I Want to Vanish" – 3:22
 Medley: – 6:16
 "Alison"
 "Living a Little, Laughing a Little" (Thom Bell, Linda Creed)
 "Tracks of My Tears" (William "Smokey" Robinson Jr., Warren Moore, Marvin Tarplin)
 "Tears of a Clown" (Stevie Wonder, Hank Cosby, Robinson)
 "No More Tearstained Make-Up" (Robinson)
 "Clowntime is Over"

Personnel
Elvis Costello - guitar, vocals
Steve Nieve - piano
with:
Pete Thomas - drums on "Man Out of Time" and "Shallow Grave"

References

Elvis Costello live albums
Steve Nieve albums
1996 live albums
Warner Records live albums